Varman is the traditional suffix of Pallava dynasty that is generally translated as "shield" or "protector", and was adopted by Khmer royal lineages.

Varman may refer to:

 Varman (surname)
 Varman dynasty of eastern India
 Varman Dynasty of Khmer Empire
 Varman, Rajasthan, a village in India